South Groveton is a town on the outskirts of Groveton in Trinity County, Texas. It was established around 1900. The population peaked at 1,000 in 1930 and declined to 175 people by the 1990s.

References

Unincorporated communities in Trinity County, Texas
Unincorporated communities in Texas